Boron carbides are boron–carbon compounds.

Boron carbide (B4C)

B13C2

α-tetragonal boron
α-tetragonal boron is a boron-rich isotropic boron carbide (B50C2).

Borafullerenes

Borafullerenes are a class of heterofullerenes in which the element substituting for carbon is boron.

See also
 Crystal structure of boron-rich metal borides

References

Sources

 
 
 
 

Inorganic carbon compounds
Boron compounds